Gheorghe Dumitru Mureșan Sr. (born 14 February 1971), also known as "Ghiță", is a Romanian former professional basketball player. At , he is tied with Manute Bol for the tallest player ever to have played in the NBA.

Early life
Mureșan was born in Tritenii de Jos, Cluj County, Romania. Although his parents were of normal height, he grew to his remarkable height due to a pituitary gland disorder called acromegaly.

Professional career

CS Universitatea Cluj-Napoca (1991–1992) 
Mureșan played competitive basketball at Universitatea Cluj, becoming national champion in 1992.

Élan Béarnais Pau-Orthez (1992–1993) 
Mureșan played professionally in the French league with Pau-Orthez during the 1992–93 season and was an instant hit with fans, also managing to win the French League Cup.

Washington Bullets / Wizards (1993–1998) 
Mureșan was selected by the NBA's Washington Bullets in the 1993 NBA draft. He played in the NBA from 1993 to 2000 showing signs of a promising career that was derailed by injuries. His best season came in the 1995–1996 campaign, when he averaged 14.5 points per game.

Mureșan was named the NBA's Most Improved Player for the 1995–96 season after averaging 14.5 points, 9.6 rebounds, 2.26 blocks per game while making a league-leading 58.4 percent of his field goals. He led in field goal percentage again the following season, with a 60.4% average. Overall, he holds career averages of 9.8 points, 6.4 rebounds, 0.5 assists, 1.48 blocks per game and a .573 field goal percentage.

New Jersey Nets (1999–2000) 
Mureșan joined the New Jersey Nets for the final 31 games of his NBA career.

Return to Pau-Orthez (2000–2001) 
After ending his NBA career, Mureșan had another stint at Pau-Orthez where he won the French league before returning to the United States with his family. He normally wore number 77, in reference to his height.

On 11 March 2007, Mureșan played a game for the Maryland Nighthawks as part of the tallest lineup in the history of basketball.

Other work

In 2004, Mureşan founded the Giant Basketball Academy (GBA), a program dedicated to teaching the proper fundamentals of basketball to boys and girls of all ages. The Academy is located in Ashburn, Virginia.

Mureşan is also part of the Washington Wizards marketing and public relations team, serving as an "ambassador" for the team.

Outside basketball, Mureșan has dabbled in acting, playing the title character in 1998 feature film My Giant starring comedian Billy Crystal. He appeared as a ventriloquist in the music video for Eminem's breakthrough single "My Name Is." He has appeared in commercials for Snickers candy bars, and sports television network ESPN. Most recently, Mureșan co-authored two young adult fitness and health books: The Boy's Fitness Guide and The Girl's Fitness Guide.

In 2013, Mureșan participated in the first annual 3v3 UMTTR (You Matter) Basketball Tournament to increase awareness, prevention and research of teen suicide, the leading cause of death among adults and children between the ages of 15 and 24.

Personal life
Mureșan and his wife Liliana and sons George and Victor have resided in Franklin Lakes, New Jersey, but they relocated to the suburbs of Washington, D.C. Since the 2016–2017 season,
his oldest son, George, has played for the Georgetown University Hoyas as a walk-on forward. His younger son Victor joined the Hoyas as a walk-on in the 2020–2021 season. Victor is 6'10" and 190lbs and has not played in the 2021–22 season.

Career statistics

NBA

Regular season

|-
| style="text-align:left;"| 1993–94
| style="text-align:left;"| Washington
| 54 || 2 || 12.0 ||.545 ||.000  ||.676 || 3.6 || 0.3 || 0.5  || 0.9 || 5.6
|-
| style="text-align:left;"| 1994–95
| style="text-align:left;"| Washington
| 73 ||58 || 23.6 ||.560 ||.000 ||.709 || 6.7 || 0.5 || 0.7 || 1.7 || 10.0
|-
| style="text-align:left;"| 1995–96
| style="text-align:left;"| Washington
| 76 || 76 || 29.5 ||style="background:#cfecec;"|.584* ||.000 ||.619 || 9.6 || 0.7 || 0.7 || 2.3 || 14.5
|-
| style="text-align:left;"| 1996–97
| style="text-align:left;"| Washington
| 73 || 69 || 25.3 ||style="background:#cfecec;"|.604* ||.000 ||.618 || 6.6 || 0.4 || 0.6 || 1.3 || 10.6
|-
| style="text-align:left;"| 1998–99
| style="text-align:left;"| New Jersey
| 1 || 0 || 1.0 ||.000  ||.000 ||.000 || 0.0 || 0.0 || 0.0 || 0.0|| 0.0
|-
| style="text-align:left;"| 1999–00
| style="text-align:left;"| New Jersey
| 30 || 2 || 8.9 ||.456 ||.000 ||.605 || 2.3 || 0.3 || 0.0 || 0.4 || 3.5
|- class=sortbottom
| style="text-align:center;" colspan=2| Career
| 307 || 207 || 21.9 ||.573 ||.000 ||.644 || 6.4 || 0.5 || 0.6 || 1.5 || 9.8

Playoffs

|-
| style="text-align:left;"|1997
| style="text-align:left;"|Washington
| 3 || 3 || 23.3 || .444 || – || .875 || 6.0 || .0 || .0 || 1.3 || 5.0

See also

 List of tallest players in National Basketball Association history
 List of tallest people

References

External links
  (archived from 2002)
Gheorghe Muresan profile at InterBasket
 
Georghe Muresan Trading Cards/Autographs Page 
NBA.com

1971 births
Living people
CS Universitatea Cluj-Napoca (men's basketball) players
Centers (basketball)
Élan Béarnais players
New Jersey Nets players
People from Cluj County
People from Franklin Lakes, New Jersey
People with gigantism
Romanian emigrants to the United States
Romanian expatriate basketball people in France
Romanian expatriate basketball people in the United States
Romanian men's basketball players
Washington Bullets draft picks
Washington Bullets players